Schola Gregoriana Pragensis (English: The Gregorian School of Prague) is an a cappella male voice choir from the Czech Republic, founded in 1987 by David Eben. Their core repertoire consists of Gregorian chant, Bohemian plainchant, and early polyphony, but they also perform modern works including some composed for them.

Description

Schola Gregoriana Pragensis
The Schola Gregoriana Pragensis is a choir from the Czech republic with primary focus on Gregorian chant and Bohemian plainchant.  The choir formed in 1987 under the direction of David Eben and was restricted in its repertoire to only liturgical music for the first two years.  Since the Velvet Revolution of 1989, the choir has extended its repertoire to include a variety of sacred music, with particular focus on Gregorian chant (monophonic Latin liturgical music) and early polyphony.

The choir has won several awards, including the Choc du monde de le musique, 10 de Repertoire and Golden Harmony (Zlatá Harmonie). Since inception they have toured a variety of countries.

Of particular importance is the choir's work in researching and performing Bohemian plainchant and early polyphony.

The choir has between six and nine members with a repertoire of various sacred music.  They have toured many countries, including Japan, Israel, Norway, Sweden, Italy, Spain, France, Germany, Austria, Belgium, the Netherlands, Luxembourg, Switzerland, Slovakia, Hungary and Poland.

Their work in the interpretation of medieval music, with particular focus on Bohemian plainsong, is particularly significant with a focus on the symbolism of neumatic notation from the 10th and 11th centuries.  Performances feature the original Bohemian plainchant tradition, including the earliest examples of polyphony.  In addition they have performed music from 14th and 15th century and more modern compositions, including some written specifically for the group.

They have produced numerous recordings under the Supraphon and other labels.

The choir has participated in early music festivals, including the Festival Early Music at Utrecht in 2014.

The work of David Eben and the choir has featured in Czech academic publications related to musicology.

David Eben

David Eben is the son of composer Petr Eben and is the founder and director of Schola Gregoriana Pragensis.  He started studies in musicology at the philosophy school of the Charles University in Prague in 1986 following completion of his training in clarinet at the Prague Conservatory.  He began concentrating on mediaeval music in 1986 and graduated from Paris Conservatory (Conservatoire de Paris) having studied Gregorian chant conducting.

He established the Schola Gregoriana Pragensis in 1987.

He regularly teaches theory and practice of Gregorian chant at summer school at Musiques et Patrimoine Rânes, Normandy, France and at the Festival de Musique Sacré de Fribourg in Switzerland.

He has collaborated with Czech radio to produce programs on Gregorian chant.

, he works at Charles University in Prague, where he lectures in musicology and liturgy.

He is a member of the music group .

Other choir members

 Stanislav Predota  is one of the founding members of Schola Gregoriana Pragensis.

Discography

The group has made the following recordings:
1995Rosa Mystica Supraphon SU 0194-2 231 
1997Liturgical YearGregorian chant
1998Antica e moderna 
1996In Pragensi Ecclesia
1999Codex Franus
2002Ach, homo fragilis
2004Missa III., Vesperae Beatae Mariae Virginis, Litaniae B. M. V. à 8.
2005Maiestas Dei
2007Salve Mater, Salve Jesu
2009Dom zu St. Blasien Orgelmusik und Gregorianischer Choral
2009Musica SacraBuddhist Shõmyõ & Gregorian Chants
2010Dialogs (Jiří Bártavioloncello)2011Adventus Domini-Carolus IV-Christus natus est: Gregorian Chant on Christmas Eve-Anno Domini 997-Musica Sacra: Buddhist Shõmyõ & Gregorian Chants''

References

External links
 
 
 
 

Musical groups established in 1987
Czech choirs
Musical groups from Prague
Professional a cappella groups
Early music choirs
Musicology
1987 establishments in Czechoslovakia